Jacques Francois (born 11 December 1992) is a Haitian footballer who plays for Atlantic City FC in the National Premier Soccer League.

Career
Francois began his college soccer career at Louisburg College in 2012, but left after one year. Francois returned to college soccer at UNC Greensboro in 2014, where he tallied 11 goals in 39 appearances with the Spartans.

While at college, Francois appeared for Premier Development League side Orlando City U-23 in 2015.

Francois signed with United Soccer League side San Antonio FC on 29 March 2016.

In 2017, Francois trialled with the Tampa Bay Rowdies, competing with the team in the 2017 Florida Cup.

References

External links 
 

1992 births
Living people
Haitian footballers
UNC Greensboro Spartans men's soccer players
North Carolina Fusion U23 players
Orlando City U-23 players
San Antonio FC players
Association football midfielders
Soccer players from St. Petersburg, Florida
USL League Two players
USL Championship players
Louisburg Hurricanes men's soccer players